Rothia zea is a moth of the family Noctuidae. This moth occurs in Madagascar.

References
Herrich-Schäffer, G. A. W. 1853–1858. Sammlung neuer oder wenig bekannter aussereuropäische Schmetterlinge. Heterocera (Nachtfalter). - — (1) 1:1–84, pls. 1–120.

Agaristinae
Moths of Madagascar
Moths of Africa
Moths described in 1853